Retinal isomerase is an enzyme that catalyzes the isomerisation of all-trans-retinal in the eye into 11-cis-retinal which is the form that most opsins bind.

all-trans-retinal  11-cis-retinal

Hence, this enzyme has one substrate, all-trans-retinal, and one product, 11-cis-retinal.

This enzyme belongs to the family of isomerases, specifically cis-trans isomerases. Its systematic name is all-trans-retinal 11-cis-trans-isomerase. Other names are retinene isomerase, and retinoid isomerase. This enzyme participates in the retinol metabolism.

References

 
 

EC 5.2.1
Enzymes of unknown structure